The 2016 Italian Touring Car Championship is the second season of the ITCC to run under TCR regulations and the 30th season since a national touring car series was revived in 1987 as the Campionato Italiano Turismo. Starting from this year, the championship takes place of Campionato Italiano Turismo Endurance and it will be divided into TCR and TCS class. The latter will include cars between 1.400 and 2.000cc, nearer to the production series.

Teams and drivers
Hankook is the official tyre supplier.

Calendar and results
The 2016 schedule was announced on 23 November 2015, with all events scheduled to be held in Italy. On 23 January, the Vallelunga round was postponed from 17 April to 4 September. On 16 March, the first round in Monza was moved forward to 30 October, while Adria was anticipated to 8 May.

Championship standings

Drivers' Championship

† – Drivers did not finish the race, but were classified as they completed over 50% of the race distance.

   - the Adria round assigned 5 points in every qualifying and race session to all the participants of the TCS class, regardless of the final result.

References

External links
 

Touring Car Championship
Italian Touring Car Championship